Mimacraea charmian, the elongata acraea mimic, is a butterfly in the family Lycaenidae. It is found in Nigeria, Cameroon and the western part of the Democratic Republic of the Congo. The habitat consists of forests.

Adults mimic Bematistes elongata.

References

Butterflies described in 1889
Poritiinae
Butterflies of Africa
Taxa named by Henley Grose-Smith
Taxa named by William Forsell Kirby